The Magic Key is a British educational animated television series based on the "Biff, Chip and Kipper" stories from the Oxford Reading Tree published by Oxford University Press, originally written by Roderick Hunt and illustrated by Alex Brychta. The series is a co-production between Collingwood O'Hare Entertainment Limited and HIT Entertainment, in association with the BBC and aired within the BBC Schools strand on BBC Two from 2000 until 2001.

Plot
The series centres on the lives of three children, Biff, Chip and Kipper Robinson, their parents, their grandmother, their friends, Wilf and Wilma Page, Nadim Shah, Anneena Patel and the Robinsons'  dog, Floppy. Floppy wears a collar around his neck with a golden key upon it.  The key is magic, as the title suggests, and seems to do some strange things whenever one of the children asks a question and Floppy wishes for something.  It starts to glow and transports the 7 children, Floppy and sometimes the Robinsons' grandmother through a vortex to other worlds, where they have exciting adventures, such as dealing with trolls in a cavern, being characters inside of a computer game, or finding the Fountain of Youth and when the adventure is done, they get a gift and the key glows and they all go home.

Alongside the main story, to fit in with the book's original educational values, there are helpful hints towards teaching children the best use of English.

Characters
 Kipper Robinson 
 Biff Robinson 
 Chip Robinson 
 Mum
 Dad
 Floppy the dog
 Gran Robinson
 Wilf Page
 Wilma Page
 Anneena Patel
 Nadim Shah
 Mrs. May

Original Stories
The Oxford Reading Tree series was first published in 1985 with a set of 30 stories, and there are now over 300 stories altogether. It is used by more than 80% of schools in the United Kingdom, and has been translated into numerous languages in over 120 countries.

The books are aimed at children aged four to nine, and could form part of an English language syllabus in line with the National curriculum, designed to help children learn to speak and read Standard English.

The original book that the series is named after was first published in January 1986. It has many differences from what the TV series would have, with the titular item being kept inside a chest instead of on Floppy's collar. The latter would not always be on every adventure with the key, either and the adventures would take place in a magic doll house.

Broadcast
It ran on the BBC Schools strand on BBC Two from 2000 to 2008 and it was also on the CBBC strand on BBC One strand from October 2000 to March 2001. It also aired on CBBC Channel's Class TV strand in 2003 and again in 2007. It also ran during the BBC Learning Zone late night strand between August and September and again in December 2006. A Welsh version titled Yr Allwedd Hud was broadcast on the S4C Ysgolion strand from 2001 to 2004.

Episodes

Merchandise/Home Media
To coincide with the TV series, Oxford University Press published a series of books based on the episodes in 2000.

HIT Entertainment released six VHS tapes of the series. The first two – "Troll Talk and Other Stories" and "The Rook King and Other Stories" were released on October 30, 2000. The other three – "Capital Letters And Full Stops". "Adjectives And Labels", and "Sentences And Questions", were released on September 24, 2001, and were aimed to teach children the basics of the English language. Another VHS titled "The Flying Circus and Other Stories" was released in the same year, 2001.  HIT would later release all 26 episodes on a two-disc box set on September 11, 2006.

References

External links
The Magic Key website

Series of children's books
British television shows based on children's books
British children's animated adventure television series
British children's animated education television series
British children's animated fantasy television series
BBC children's television shows
2000 British television series debuts
2001 British television series endings
2000s British animated television series
English-language television shows
Animated television series about children
Animated television series about dogs
Television series by Mattel Creations
HIT Entertainment
CBeebies